Avâtenio Antônio da Costa (Ceninho) (born 13 July 1933, in Ituiutaba, Brazil) is a former Brazilian footballer who played as a forward for clubs of Brazil, Chile and Portugal. He made one appearance for the Brazil national team in 1957.

Clubs
 Siderurgica 1950–1952
 Fluminense 1953–1954
 Guarani 1955
 America-RJ 1956
 Vitória 1957
 Internacional 1958–1959
 Braga 1960–1961
 Audax Italiano 1962–1963
 Cruzeiro do Sul 1963
 Rabello 1964-1965

References

External links
 

1933 births
Living people
Brazilian footballers
Association football forwards
Brazil international footballers
Campeonato Brasileiro Série A players
Primeira Liga players
Chilean Primera División players
Fluminense FC players
America Football Club (Rio de Janeiro) players
Esporte Clube Vitória players
Sport Club Internacional players
S.C. Braga players
Audax Italiano footballers
Brazilian expatriate footballers
Brazilian expatriate sportspeople in Chile
Expatriate footballers in Chile
Brazilian expatriate sportspeople in Portugal
Expatriate footballers in Portugal